Carex siderosticta is a species of sedge native to East Asia. It is the only species of Carex known to produce "pseudo-lateral" culms, which appear to be lateral, but derive from the apical meristem. It is the type species of Carex subg. Siderosticta.

References

External links
Carex siderosticta, GBIF
Carex siderosticta, Encyclopedia of Life

siderosticta
Flora of Asia
Plants described in 1873